Claudio Andres Oyarzo Muñoz (born 5 November 1979) is a Swedish metal musician and youtuber. He currently lives in Gothenburg and played guitar with the melodic rock act Minora from Gothenburg and the bass with the Gothenburg-Stockholm metal band The Resistance. He played as a session member for a few months before he was asked to join the band, which happened during the video recording of the first single from the album Scars, called "Clearing the Slate".

The Resistance is mostly known as a Swedish death metal supergroup containing Jesper Strömblad (Ex. In flames), Glenn Ljungström (Ex. In Flames) and Marco Aro (The Haunted).

He is also known for his role as Ramon in the Swedish film Snabba Cash – Livet Deluxe, where he plays a robber together with Matias Varela, Joel Kinnaman among others.
He also has a YouTube channel.

Appearances

The Resistance 
 Scars (2013) (Guitar solo on I Bend You Break and Your Demise)

Minora 
 Imago (2011)
  Into the Ocean (2013, EP)

Movies 
 Snabba Cash Livet Deluxe (2013)

Notes

References
http://www.varnamonyheter.se/gislaveds-kommun/fran-gislaved-till-snabba-cash#.UwIbjvvDXTQ
http://www.imdb.com/name/nm5854009/
http://www.rocknytt.net/nyheter/12302-metal-musiker-gor-skadisdebut-i-snabba-cash-livet-deluxe
http://www.slavestate.se/?e=2109
http://www.blabbermouth.net/news/the-resistance-recruits-session-bassist/
https://www.youtube.com/watch?v=M6_eL8kIv5g
https://www.youtube.com/watch?v=JxFFJSk_UMw

External links
 https://www.facebook.com/theresistanceswe
 https://www.facebook.com/minoraofficial

Living people
People from Gothenburg
Swedish heavy metal guitarists
1979 births
21st-century guitarists